Cumbria 2 was a short-lived competitive rugby union league at tier 8 of the English rugby union system run by the English Rugby Football Union for club sides based in Cumbria.  Teams were promoted to Cumbria 1 and as it was the lowest ranked RFU league in the county there is no relegation.  Each season a team from Cumbria 2 was picked to take part in the RFU Senior Vase - a national competition for clubs at level 8.

Cumbria 2 was formed for the 2018–19 season when the RFU had to restructure the Cumbria and northern leagues due to 19 Lancashire based clubs withdrawing from the league structure to form their own competition.  A consequence of this was that North Lancashire/Cumbria was cancelled and the Cumbria League was split into two divisions, with the North Lancashire/Cumbria clubs joining the top 3 Cumbria League clubs in Cumbria 1, and the rest of the sides (including some 2nd XV teams) forming Cumbria 2.

After just one season Cumbria 2 was cancelled with teams moving into a single division Cumbria 1.

Teams 2018–19

Cumbria 2 honours

Number of league titles

Silloth (1)

See also
 Cumbria RU
 English rugby union system
 Rugby union in England

References

Defunct rugby union leagues in England
Rugby union in Cumbria
Sports leagues established in 2018
Sports leagues disestablished in 2019